Harry McGilberry (January 19, 1950 – April 3, 2006) was an American R&B and soul singer and latter-day bass singer for The Temptations between 1995 and 2003.

Born Harry McGilberry Jr. in Philadelphia, Pennsylvania, McGilberry was a member of the R&B group The Futures and later the Temptations,  replacing ailing bassist and former P-Funk member Ray Davis to join the quintet in 1995 and recorded the albums Phoenix Rising, Ear-Resistible and Awesome with them.

McGilberry was fired from the group in 2003 by Temptations leader Otis Williams for a reported drug habit (he was replaced by Joe Herndon of The Spaniels). He later joined a Temptations splinter group, 'The Temptations Experience', replacing the then recently departed Ray Davis.

McGilberry died of an apparent drug overdose on April 3, 2006 at the age of 56. He was known by family members and friends as "Boom-Boom".

McGilberry is buried at Eden Cemetery in Collingdale, Pennsylvania.

External links
The Dead Rock Stars Club 2006 January To June

References

The Temptations members
American rhythm and blues singers
Musicians from Philadelphia
1950 births
2006 deaths
Burials at Eden Cemetery (Collingdale, Pennsylvania)
Drug-related deaths in Nevada
Singers from Pennsylvania
20th-century American singers